Hasia R. Diner is an American historian.   Diner is the Paul S. and Sylvia Steinberg Professor of American Jewish History; Professor of Hebrew and Judaic Studies, History; Director of the Goldstein-Goren Center for American Jewish History at New York University and Interim Director of Glucksman Ireland House NYU.

Life
Diner received a B.A. in 1968 from the University of Wisconsin. She went on to earn an M.A. in 1970 from the University of Chicago; and a Ph.D. in 1975 from the University of Illinois at Chicago. Her PhD dissertation "In the Almost Promised Land: Jewish Leaders and Blacks, 1915-1935" was directed by Professor Leo Schelbert.

In 2002 she published Her Works Praise Her: A History of Jewish Women in America from Colonial Times to the Present.

In 2009 she published We Remember with Reverence and Love: American Jews and the Myth of Silence after the Holocaust, 1945-1962. According to Adam Kirsch, the book "drive(s) a stake, once and for all, through the heart of a historical falsehood that has proved remarkably durable. This is the notion that, as Diner’s subtitle has it, American Jews were initially 'silent' about the Holocaust—that the greatest catastrophe in Jewish history was somehow swept under the rug of American Jewry’s collective consciousness."

Awards
 2009-2010 OAH Distinguished Lectureship Program
2009 National Jewish Book Award for We Remember With Reverence and Love: American Jews and the Myth of Silence after the Holocaust, 1945-1962
 2010 Guggenheim Fellowship
2013 National Jewish Book Award for 1929: Mapping the Jewish World

Books
 The Oxford Handbook of the Jewish Diaspora, editor, (Oxford University Press, 2021)
1929: Mapping the Jewish World. (NYU Press, 2013)  (Winner of a 2013 National Jewish Book Award)

  We Remember With Reverence and Love: American Jews and the Myth of Silence after the Holocaust, 1945-1962, NYU Press, 2009,  (Winner of a 2009 National Jewish Book Award)
 The Jews of the United States, 1654 to 2000, University of California Press, 2006, 
 Hungering for America: Italian, Irish and Jewish Foodways in the Age of Migration (Cambridge:Harvard University Press, 2002) 
 Her Works Praise Her: A History of Jewish Women in America from Colonial Times to the Present (with Beryl Lieff Benderly) (New York: Basic Books, 2002) 
 The Lower East Side Memories: The Jewish Place in America. (Princeton:Princeton University Press, 2000.) 
 American Jews (New York: Oxford University Press, 1998). (Part of a series for young readers) -Reissued, 2003, as  A New Promised Land: A History of the Jews in America. Oxford University Press US, 2003, 
 In the Almost Promised Land: American Jews and Blacks. 1915-1935 (Baltimore: Johns Hopkins University Press, 1995 ; reissue of 1977 edition Greenwood Press, 1977) online review
 A Time for Gathering. 1820-1880: The Second Migration, Vol. 2 in, The Jewish People in America, Henry Feingold, ed. (Baltimore: Johns Hopkins University Press, 1992) 
 Erin’s Daughters in America: Irish Immigrant Women in the Nineteenth Century (Baltimore: Johns Hopkins University Press, 1984) 
  Women and urban society: a guide to information sources (Gale Research Co., 1979)

External links 

 Hasia Diner Papers at New York University Archives

References

New York University faculty
Historians of Jews and Judaism
21st-century American historians
University of Wisconsin–Madison alumni
Living people
University of Illinois Chicago alumni
University of Chicago alumni
American women historians
Year of birth missing (living people)
21st-century American women writers
Jewish women writers